Dragan Tomić (9 December 1935 – 21 June 2022) was a Serbian politician, a member of the Socialist Party of Serbia, who was the President of the National Assembly of Serbia, holding the position from 1994 to 2001. Considered a loyal supporter of Slobodan Milošević, Tomić was director of RTV Politika, one of Serbia's main TV stations, and director of Jugopetrol AD, the state oil company.

After Milošević reached the end of his two allowed terms as President of Serbia and got himself elected as President of Serbia and Montenegro, Tomić by default became acting President of Serbia, from 23 July to 29 December 1997. In the second cabinet of the Prime Minister Mirko Marjanović, Tomić was the Deputy Prime Minister of Serbia, from 1998 to 2000.

Tomić was closely tied to Milošević. A 2000 report by Germany's Federal Intelligence Service alleged that Milošević essentially ran a criminal operation, particularly after the 1992 sanctions on Yugoslavia caused "massive smuggling operations...controlled by Milošević and his cronies, who made vast profits from it"; Tomić was named as one of those cronies. Under Milošević's regime, Tomić led Jugopetrol when "fuel-smuggling was a multi-million dollar business", and "reportedly profited handsomely from the illicit oil that flowed into Serbia during sanctions". Serbian mobster and paramilitary leader Arkan gave Tomić a medal because he had provided gasoline for Arkan's Serb Volunteer Guard, a paramilitary unit guilty of war crimes and ethnic cleansing.

References

1935 births
2022 deaths
People from Zenica-Doboj Canton
Kosovo Serbs
Socialist Party of Serbia politicians
Presidents of the National Assembly (Serbia)
Presidents of Serbia within Yugoslavia
Socialist People's Party (Serbia) politicians
Central Committee of the League of Communists of Yugoslavia members
Candidates for President of Serbia